Alyaksandr Aleksandrovich (born 6 July 1997) is a Belarusian professional footballer. He plays for Belshina Bobruisk.

References

External links

Profile at pressball.by

1997 births
People from Vitebsk District
Sportspeople from Vitebsk Region
Living people
Belarusian footballers
Association football midfielders
FC Vitebsk players
FC Orsha players
FC Smolevichi players
FC Belshina Bobruisk players
Belarusian Premier League players
Belarusian First League players
Russian Second League players
Belarusian expatriate footballers
Expatriate footballers in Russia
Belarusian expatriate sportspeople in Russia